The 1935 Baltimore mayoral election saw the reelection of Howard W. Jackson for a second consecutive and third overall term.

General election
The general election was held May 7.

References

Baltimore mayoral
Mayoral elections in Baltimore
Baltimore